The Waitangi dildo incident occurred on 5 February 2016 in Waitangi, New Zealand, when a protester flung a rubber dildo at Minister of Economic Development Steven Joyce, striking him in the face. The incident became international news, and was quoted and parodied in art, music, and television comedy.

Background 
Waitangi Day, New Zealand's national holiday, commemorates the signing of the Treaty of Waitangi between the British Crown and representatives of Māori on 6 February 1840. Because the Treaty of Waitangi was for many years ignored by European colonists, being declared "a simple nullity"  in the 1877 Wi Parata v Bishop of Wellington judgement, Waitangi Day celebrations have frequently been a scene of political protest. Politicians attending have been jostled and heckled; mud was thrown at the Leader of the Opposition Don Brash in 2004, and the Prime Minister John Key was grabbed by two protestors in 2009.

In February 2016, New Zealand had just signed the 12-nation Trans-Pacific Partnership (TPP) trade agreement, which had been widely criticised by Māori as undermining the self-determination guaranteed to them by the Treaty of Waitangi. Prime Minister John Key wanted to respond to critics of the TPP at Waitangi, but was told he would not be allowed to discuss politics on the marae. Two days before the Waitangi ceremonies, where a large anti-TPP protest was promised, Key decided not to attend, and sent senior politician and Minister for Economic Development Steven Joyce as the government's representative.

Event 
While Joyce was speaking to reporters at Te Tii Marae, Waitangi, on the day before the celebrations, Josie Butler, a Christchurch nurse, threw what appeared to be a dildo (in the form of a large flesh-toned rubber penis and testicles) at him. The dildo rebounded from his face, and the moment was captured on film. Joyce responded by saying "Goodo". Butler, who was protesting New Zealand's signing of the TPP, shouted "That’s for raping our sovereignty." She was arrested but later released without charge. Butler later explained that she was concerned about the TPP's effect on the cost of medications for her patients; the significance of the dildo was not explained.

Aftermath 
The incident, at the time referred to as "dildogate" (using the "-gate" suffix, in common with other political controversies), became an international sensation. Joyce was briefly nicknamed "Dildo Baggins", a Lord of the Rings reference to Bilbo Baggins. Soon after the incident, Joyce tweeted, "Someone send the gif over to John Oliver so we can get it over with ..." (Oliver, a television comedian, was at the time repeatedly lampooning news from New Zealand.) Oliver responded  with an extravagant segment on his show Last Week Tonight featuring a redesigned New Zealand flag (brandished by Sir Peter Jackson and sporting Joyce's face and the dildo), a rain of dildos, performers in giant dildo costumes, and a choir singing about the incident to the tune of the Hallelujah Chorus. Joyce responded on Twitter: "Well that was actually pretty funny."

The dildo 
Although the object thrown at Joyce was described by media at the time as a "dildo" or "sex toy", Butler later revealed it was actually a "dog's squeaky toy". It was chosen after she Googled "most effective form of protest" and learned about the 2008 Bush shoeing incident; a canine toy was chosen as it was less likely to harm Joyce than a shoe.

Documentary-maker Hayden Donnell afterwards attempted to locate the dildo. As Butler was never charged with a crime, the dildo was not evidence, although it had been confiscated by a police officer at the scene. Donnell devoted the first episode of the show Get It to Te Papa to the hunt for the dildo, so it might be accessioned by the Museum of New Zealand Te Papa Tongarewa, but discovered that the police had thrown it away.

See also 

 Waitangi Day

References

External links 

Footage of the Waitangi dildo incident
"Dildogate" sequence, Last Week Tonight with John Oliver, 15 February 2016
Get It to Te Papa S01E01: Waitangi Dildo
"Dildo Baggins" by band Unsanitary Napkin, a song inspired by the incident
Article on artist Hannah Salmon, featuring the work Remembering Dildo Baggins (2018), inspired by the incident

Protest tactics
2016 in New Zealand
2016 in politics
Protests in New Zealand
Sex toys